The 105th Aviation Brigade was formed from the disbanded Yugoslav 105th Fighter-Bomber Aviation Regiment in the spring of 1993 by the Military of Serbian Krajina at Udbina Airport. Its accurate organization is unknown, and it's not exactly clear whether the brigade was part of Republika Srpska Air Force, because the aircraft had same roundels.

It consisted from at least one combat squadron nicknamed "Kobre" (Cobras - same as former 249th Squadron) and 56th Mixed Helicopter Squadron.

The brigade was equipped with 12 J-21 Jastreb light ground-attack aircraft, at least two G-2 Galeb trainer jets, 4 Soko Gazelle helicopters and four Gazelle Gama anti-tank helicopters, two Mil Mi-8T transport helicopters, one Antonov An-2 and number of Utva 66, Utva 75, J-20 Kraguj  and Zlin Z-526 aircraft.

Aircraft from Udbina airport have taken part in wars in both Croatia and Bosnia because the Republika Srpska Air Force aircraft at Banja Luka airport were unable to take off under the no-fly zone over Bosnia and Herzegovina. In several combats Gazelle Gama anti-tank helicopters were very effective destroying Croatian army tanks.

At the time of the Croatian Operation Storm most of aircraft in flying condition had retreated to Banja Luka. Transport helicopters had performed their last evacuation flights. By the fall of the Republic of Serbian Krajina in summer 1995 and the defeat of Military of Serbian Krajina the 105th Aviation Brigade ceased to exist.

The commander of the brigade was Ratko Dopuđa.

Gallery

See also
 Banja Luka incident

References

Military of Serbian Krajina
Military units and formations established in 1993
Military units and formations of the Bosnian War
Military units and formations of the Croatian War of Independence
Military units and formations disestablished in 1995
1993 establishments in Croatia